The Adoration of the Magi is a 1619 Baroque painting by the Spanish artist Diego Velázquez now held in the  Museo del Prado. It shows three kings presenting gifts to the Christ child: Melchior, who kneels in the foreground; Balthazar, who stands behind him wearing a red cape and a lace collar; and Caspar, who appears between the other two. An unidentified young man who stands behind Balthazar is looking on. Kneeling near the Virgin's left shoulder is Saint Joseph. The size and format of the painting indicate that it was made for an altarpiece.

Carl Justi praised Adoration of the Magi as being "distinguished by great power of colouring and chiaroscuro."

History 
The earliest record of this painting is from about 1764, when it was in the Jesuit Novitiate of San Luis, Seville.

References

Carr, D. W., Bray, X., & Velázquez, D. (2006). Velázquez. London: National Gallery.

External links
Velázquez , exhibition catalog from The Metropolitan Museum of Art (fully available online as PDF), which contains material on Adoration of the Magi (see index)

1619 paintings
Religious paintings by Diego Velázquez
Seville-period paintings by Diego Velázquez
Paintings by Diego Velázquez in the Museo del Prado
Velázquez
Paintings by Diego Velázquez